Salvador "Sam" Anzelmo (November 22, 1920 – June 1, 2014) was an American politician and lawyer.

Born in Chicago, Illinois, Anzelmo moved back to New Orleans, Louisiana with his family. He went to Warren Easton High School and Louisiana State University and then served in the United States Army during World War II. In 1950, he graduated from Loyola Law School and then practiced law. He served in the Louisiana House of Representatives from 1960 to 1972. He then as an attorney for the Louisiana State Legislature and then New Orleans city attorney. He died in Deland, Florida, and was interred at Florida National Cemetery.

Notes

1920 births
2014 deaths
Politicians from Chicago
Politicians from New Orleans
Louisiana State University alumni
Loyola Law School alumni
Members of the Louisiana House of Representatives
United States Army soldiers
United States Army personnel of World War II
Lawyers from Chicago
Warren Easton High School alumni
Burials at Florida National Cemetery
Lawyers from New Orleans
20th-century American lawyers